The Shrimp People is a 1991 novel by Eurasian Singaporean writer Rex Shelley. The book won National Book Development Council of Singapore (NBDCS) Book Award in 1992.

Plot
The novel tells the story of Bertha Rodrigues, the youngest child of police inspector James Rodrigues and Mary Gomez, a housewife. Their family is Eurasian, descended from the Portuguese. Bertha is a gifted hockey player who becomes embroiled in the espionage activities of Indonesia: the Indonesians are determined to upset the political unity of Singapore and Malaya after the 1962 Singaporean national referendum. The book then moves to a surprising conclusion.

References

Singaporean novels
1991 novels
Novels set in Singapore
Novels set in Malaysia